St Oliver Plunkett's GAA may refer to:

Oliver Plunketts GAA, a sports club based in Ahiohill, Ireland
St Oliver Plunketts/Eoghan Ruadh GAA, a sports club in Dublin, Ireland
St Oliver Plunkett's GAA (Westmeath), a hurling club in Mullingar, Ireland

See also
St Oliver Plunkett Park, a sports venue